Lillico may refer to:

 Alexander Lillico (1872–1966), Tasmanian politician
 Elliot Lillico (1905–1994), Australian politician
 Lillico, Tasmania, a suburb of the City of Devonport
 Lillico Beach Conservation Area, a protected area of Tasmania, Australia

See also
 Henry Kendall Ltd v William Lillico Ltd, a 1969 English contract law case